West Covina is a suburban city in Los Angeles County, California, United States. The population for the city was 106,098 at the 2010 census.

West Covina is bordered by Covina to the northeast, Baldwin Park and Irwindale to the northwest, La Puente and Valinda to the southwest, Industry to the south, Ramona to the east, and Walnut to the southeast.

History

West Covina was incorporated as an independent city in 1923 to prevent the city of Covina from building a sewage farm in the area. Benjamin Franklin Maxson, Jr., (1897-1928) initiated the incorporation process and was the first mayor.  Walnut groves and orange groves continued to flourish. The population in 1930 was 769 and blossomed to 1,549 in 1940. As a result of remarkable expansion during the post World War II building boom, West Covina became one of the fastest-growing U.S. cities between 1950 and 1960, experiencing a growth in population of 1025.69% from less than 5,000 to more than 50,000 citizens. the decades 1960 and 2000 demonstrated steady growth for the West Covina, which had slowed significantly by the time of the 2010 census.

The City of West Covina began the second half of the 20th century with new developments and projects, mostly brought on by big business. The City Hall and police facility were built in 1969 as the first phase of an example of a Joint Powers Authority in the County of Los Angeles. The Civic Center Joint Powers Authority, consisting of the County of Los Angeles and the City of West Covina, also completed a three-level parking structure in the Civic Center complex. The Civic Center complex includes the Los Angeles County Regional Library and the Citrus Municipal Court building and the city offices.

The first Redevelopment Agency project included a regional shopping center, the West Covina Fashion Plaza, with three major department stores and 150 shops in an air-conditioned, enclosed mall. It also included the revitalization of the older sections of the shopping center. The Fashion Plaza has provided the citizens of the San Gabriel Valley with convenient access to all shopping needs. In 1991 the mall was renovated adding a food court and additional shops, as well as the redecorating of the entire mall. The mall was renamed "The Plaza at West Covina". The Plaza opened a new . wing in October 1993 featuring 50 new stores including a new Robinson's-May and interior renovation throughout The Plaza.

The Redevelopment Agency's efforts have also resulted in several major office buildings in the city, such as "The Lakes", in addition to two new community shopping centers, freestanding retail developments, restaurants, residential projects, and the Auto Plaza.

West Covina was the shooting for scenes of Mondo Burger and the title role of the restaurant in the 1997 family comedy film, Good Burger, directed by Brian Robbins.

A 2020 ranking of the fiscal health of California cities issued by State Auditor Elaine Howle's office placed West Covina as the ninth-worst in the state  The city was also audited by the state the same year, as the state auditor had determined that the city's poor finances put it at high risk for default.

West Covina was incorporated in 1923 to prevent Covina from establishing a sewage farm within the current city boundaries. Walnut groves and orange groves continued to flourish decades later.

Geography

Climate 
The San Gabriel Valley region has a hot-summer Mediterranean climate, with summer temperatures averaging above .

Demographics

The 2010 United States Census reported that West Covina had a population of 106,098. The racial makeup of West Covina was 42.8% White (15.3% Non-Hispanic White), 4.5% Black,  1.0% Native American, 25.8% Asian, 0.2% Pacific Islander,  21.3% from other races, and 4.4% from two or more races. Persons of Hispanic or Latino origin were 53.2%.

The Census reported that 105,424 people (99.4% of the population) lived in households, 351 (0.3%) lived in non-institutionalized group quarters, and 323 (0.3%) were institutionalized.

There were 31,596 households, out of which 13,670 (43.3%) had children under the age of 18 living in them, 17,650 (55.9%) were opposite-sex married couples living together, 5,402 (17.1%) had a female householder with no husband present, 2,308 (7.3%) had a male householder with no wife present.  There were 1,664 (5.3%) unmarried opposite-sex partnerships, and 202 (0.6%) same-sex married couples or partnerships. 4,795 households (15.2%) were made up of individuals, and 2,164 (6.8%) had someone living alone who was 65 years of age or older. The average household size was 3.34.  There were 25,360 families (80.3% of all households); the average family size was 3.68.

The population was spread out, with 26,075 people (24.6%) under the age of 18, 11,326 people (10.7%) aged 18 to 24, 28,860 people (27.2%) aged 25 to 44, 26,974 people (25.4%) aged 45 to 64, and 12,863 people (12.1%) who were 65 years of age or older.  The median age was 36.0 years. For every 100 females, there were 93.1 males.  For every 100 females age 18 and over, there were 89.7 males.

The homeowner vacancy rate was 1.1%; the rental vacancy rate was 4.8%.  70,474 people (66.4% of the population) lived in owner-occupied housing units and 34,950 people (32.9%) lived in rental housing units.

During 20092013, West Covina had a median household income of $67,088, with 10% of the population living below the federal poverty line.

In 2017, there were more than 10,000 Filipino Americans living in West Covina; they make up the majority population in the south side of the city.

West Covina is broken up into five districts.

Most of the foreign-born population in West Covina were born in Mexico 27.3%,
Philippines	 18.9%, Mainland China 13.7%, Vietnam 9.6% 
Taiwan 5.5%, El Salvador 3.1%, Hong Kong 2.7%, Guatemala 1.5%, Korea 1.3% and Indonesia 1.2%.

Mexican and Filipino are the most common ancestries in West Covina.

Economy

Top employers
According to the city's 2020 Comprehensive Annual Financial Report, the top employers in the city are:

Shopping
There are three major shopping centers in West Covina: Plaza West Covina, Eastland Center, and The Heights at West Covina.

Plaza West Covina
Plaza West Covina is a regional mall that has 208 shops, stores, and restaurants. The mall is two levels and is anchored by Macy's (180,000 sq ft.) to the east, JC Penney (193,963 sq ft.) to the south, Sears (137,820 sq ft.) to the west, Best Buy (45,000 sq ft.) to the north, and the XXI Forever flagship store, also to the north. There is a food court on the second level as well as other restaurants, and food and drink kiosks throughout the mall. The mall is known for its many fashion shops and high-end fashion boutiques.

Eastland Center 
The Eastland Center is a power center which has undergone major renovations since it opened in 1957. Eastland is two levels, with parking for the lower level on south side of the center and parking for the upper level on the north side. It has many larger department stores like Burlington Coat Factory, Dick's Sporting Goods, and PetSmart. Eastland Center is anchored by Walmart to the west and by Target   to the east.

The Heights at West Covina
The Heights at West Covina is a new  retail shopping center located just south of Big League Dreams Sports Park. It is anchored by The Home Depot to the north, and Target to the south. The center has many stores and restaurants.

Parks and recreation

West Covina Sportsplex
The West Covina Sportsplex is a  commercial and recreational center opened in 2007.  Built on a former landfill, the center includes a sports park, commercial development, and public golf course.

Government

Education

Primary and secondary schools
Public schools in West Covina administered by the Covina-Valley Unified School District include:

 Grovecenter Elementary School
 Mesa Elementary School
 Rowland Avenue Elementary School
 Workman Avenue Elementary School
 Traweek Middle School
 South Hills High School

Public schools in West Covina administered by the Rowland Unified School District include:

 Hollingworth Elementary
 Telesis Academy
 Giano Intermediate

Public schools in West Covina administered by the West Covina Unified School District include:

 California Elementary 
 Cameron Elementary  
 Merced Elementary  
 Merlinda Elementary  
 Monte Vista Elementary  
 Orangewood Elementary  
 Vine Elementary  
 Wescove Elementary 
 Edgewood Middle School  
 Hollencrest Middle School 
 Walnut Grove Intermediate  
 Coronado High School 
 Edgewood High School
 MT. SAC Early College Academy
 West Covina High School

Charter School (Standalone)

 San Jose Charter Academy

Infrastructure

Transportation
Foothill Transit, based in West Covina, provides services across San Gabriel Valley with buses going to Downtown Los Angeles and Montclair. In addition to the bus services provided by Foothill Transit, the Los Angeles Metropolitan Transportation Agency, commonly known as Metro, provides services from El Monte Station to Cal Poly Pomona.
The city operates the Go West shuttle bus system, with three routes that provide transportation to several West Covina destinations. The city also provides a free shuttle bus to the Baldwin Park Metrolink station.

Healthcare
Emanate Health Queen of the Valley Hospital in West Covina offers the following services: emergency room, surgery, maternity care, pediatrics, neurology, and diagnostic imaging.

Notable people

 Major League Baseball pitcher Dan Haren, (born September 17, 1980) is an American former professional baseball pitcher. Haren played in Major League Baseball (MLB) for the St. Louis Cardinals, Oakland Athletics, Arizona Diamondbacks, Los Angeles Angels of Anaheim, Washington Nationals, Los Angeles Dodgers, Miami Marlins, and Chicago Cubs. He now serves as an executive with the Diamondbacks. Haren grew up in West Covina, California.
 Major League Baseball pitcher Rick Aguilera, a three-time All-Star who played in two World Series, attended Edgewood High School in West Covina.
 National Football League quarterback and broadcaster Troy Aikman was born at Queen of the Valley Hospital in West Covina, but moved to Oklahoma as a child. After playing for UCLA, he was the No. 1 overall pick in the 1989 NFL Draft by the Dallas Cowboys. He led the Cowboys to 3 Super Bowl championships (XXVII, XXVIII, and XXX), was named Super Bowl XXVII MVP, and in 2006 he was inducted into the Pro Football Hall of Fame.
 Drag queen Jackie Beat.
 Major League Baseball outfielder and coach Tom Brunansky attended West Covina High School.
 Actor Robert Buckley was born in West Covina.
 Jeff Cox attended South Hills High School. He has been a Major League Baseball player and coach.
 Electronic Dance Music producer and DJ Deorro currently resides in West Covina.
 Major League Baseball pitcher Joey Eischen was born in West Covina and graduated from West Covina High School and is from the Class of 1988. He lettered in football, basketball, baseball and tennis. He played in the majors from 1994 to 2006.
 Baseball pitcher Carlos Fisher was born in West Covina. He pitched for the Cincinnati Reds.
 Major League Baseball outfielder Jeremy Giambi attended South Hills High School. He played for four MLB teams and was featured in the film Moneyball.
 Major League Baseball first baseman Jason Giambi was born in West Covina and attended South Hills High School. He was voted American League MVP in 2000.
 Chinese Basketball Association basketball player Jonathan Gibson (basketball) was born in West Covina.
 Rock star Joan Jett, although born in Pennsylvania, moved with her family to West Covina when she was 15.
 Major League Baseball outfielder Jay Johnstone, although born in Connecticut, graduated Edgewood HS in 1960.
 Mystery novelist Lee Charles Kelley lived in West Covina from age 4 to 15. 
 Major League Baseball infielder Mike Lamb was born in West Covina.
 Major League Baseball pitcher Cory Lidle attended South Hills High School. He was killed in a plane crash in 2006.
 Major League Baseball pitcher Jim Merritt attended Edgewood High School.
 Actress Nia Peeples was raised in West Covina; she attended and graduated from West Covina High School, class of 1980, and was also Homecoming Queen.
 Author Brigitte Secard was born and raised in West Covina.
 World record-breaking long jumper Mike Powell attended Edgewood High School.
 Major League Baseball pitcher Jo-Jo Reyes was born in West Covina. He has pitched for numerous teams.
 Actor and director Tim Robbins was born in West Covina. His films include The Shawshank Redemption, Mystic River, Bull Durham and Dead Man Walking.
 Major League Baseball outfielder Gary Roenicke attended Edgewood High School.
 Major League Baseball pitcher and manager Ron Roenicke attended Edgewood High School.
 Major League Baseball pitcher Aaron Small attended South Hills High School. He pitched for seven MLB teams.
 Brian Stewart defensive backs coach at the University of Nebraska, lived in West Covina from 1976 to 1982.
 Major League Baseball pitcher and executive Bill Stoneman attended West Covina High School.
 Chicano rapper Mr. Capone-E was born in Pakistan but he and his family moved to West Covina at an early age.
 Mexican-American singer Larry Hernández lives in West Covina.
Gabe York (born 1993), basketball player for Hapoel Tel Aviv of the Israeli Basketball Premier League
 Professional tennis player Ernesto Escobedo resides in West Covina.
 Television personality Scheana Shay was born in West Covina.
 Songwriter Greg Camp was born in West Covina.
 Artist Keith Parkinson was born in West Covina.
 Swedish progressive rock musician and songwriter Nad Sylvan was born in West Covina.

In popular culture
West Covina and the San Gabriel Valley are the setting for the US television series Crazy Ex-Girlfriend. It is inaccurately depicted as being part of the Inland Empire in the pilot episode but it is corrected later in the series and being "two hours from the beach, four in traffic." In fact, West Covina is only about 34 minutes from the beach in Santa Monica without traffic.

The 1997 Nickelodeon film Good Burger was mostly filmed in West Covina.

The 1974 US television series Chopper One depicts the activities of a helicopter unit in the West Covina Police Department (as shown by the WCPD uniform patches).

The USS West Covina was a Federation California-class starship operated by Starfleet in the late 24th century featured in Star Trek Lower Decks.

Sister cities

West Covina's sister cities are:
Fengtai (Beijing), China
Ōtawara, Japan

See also

List of cities in Los Angeles County, California
List of cities and towns in California
Demographics of Filipino Americans
List of Mexican-American communities
List of U.S. cities with large Hispanic populations
List of U.S. cities with significant Chinese-American populations

References

External links
 

 
Cities in Los Angeles County, California
Communities in the San Gabriel Valley
Incorporated cities and towns in California
Populated places established in 1923
Chicano and Mexican neighborhoods in California
Filipino-American culture in California